Joe Rose is an American actor and stuntman. He is known for his role as Troy, the "sloppy joe guy" in Scrubs.

Rose has also been in many different movies. He played Cole in the film Ghosts Never Sleep and also did stunts for Arizona Werewolf.

Filmography

References

External links

Living people
Year of birth missing (living people)